Vladimir Lyubovitsky (born 4 January 1964) is a Russian bobsledder. He competed in the four man event at the 1992 Winter Olympics, representing the Unified Team.

References

External links
 

1964 births
Living people
Russian male bobsledders
Olympic bobsledders of the Unified Team
Bobsledders at the 1992 Winter Olympics
People from Kungur
Sportspeople from Perm Krai